Valentine School may refer to:

in the United States
 Valentine School (Chicopee, Massachusetts)
 Valentine School of the Valentine Independent School District
Valentine Public School, Valentine, Nebraska, listed on the NRHP in Cherry County, Nebraska
Schoolhouse at Truxton Canyon Training School, Valentine, Arizona, also known as Valentine Indian School, listed on the NRHP in Mohave County, Arizona

See also
Valentine House (disambiguation)
Valentine Building (disambiguation)